Hednota ocypetes is a moth in the family Crambidae. It was described by Edward Meyrick in 1936. It is found in Australia, where it has been recorded from New South Wales.

References

Crambinae
Moths described in 1936